Khamisabad (also Romanized as Khamīsābād; also known as Khamsābād) is a village in Gowdin Rural District, in the Central District of Kangavar County, Kermanshah Province, Iran. At the 2006 census, its population was 626, in 164 families.

References 

Populated places in Kangavar County